Air Company Yakutia ( – Aviakompanija «Yakutiya») is an airline based in Yakutsk, Sakha Republic, Russia. It operates domestic passenger services in Russia and within the Commonwealth of Independent States as well as destinations in Europe, Asia and North America from its hubs at Yakutsk Airport and Moscow's Vnukovo Airport. The airline was founded in 2002 and is owned by the government of the Republic of Sakha. In 2020, it became part of Russia's single far-eastern airline, along with four other airlines.

History

The airline was founded as Sakha Avia, the former Aeroflot Yakutsk Division and also previously known as Yakutaviatrans. It operated cargo charters to Africa, Asia, Europe and the Middle East until it filed for bankruptcy in early 1999. It emerged in 2000 and is controlled by the regional government, Neryungri State Air Enterprise. It merged with Yakutavia in 2002 and changed its name to form Yakutia Air Company.

Destinations

As of March 2015, Yakutia Airlines operates more than 55 flights.

Fleet

Current fleet
The Yakutia Airlines fleet comprises the following aircraft:

Fleet development
At the 2019 MAKS Air Show at Zhukovsky International Airport, Moscow Yakutia Airlines signed a tentative agreement for 5 Irkut MC-21 aircraft. Delivery of the new aircraft was originally expected to be in the second half of 2021.

Former fleet

Accidents and incidents
On 4 February 2010, Flight 425, operated by an Antonov An-24 RA-47360 suffered an engine failure on take-off from Yakutsk Airport for Olyokminsk Airport. During the subsequent landing, the nose and port main undercarriage were retracted, causing substantial damage to the aircraft. No one was hurt or killed in the crash and the aircraft was subsequently repaired and placed back into service.
On 10 October 2018, Flight 414, operated by a Sukhoi Superjet 100 RA-89011 run out of the runway on landing at Yakutsk Airport from Ulan-Ude. During the event, the main landing gear of the aircraft collapsed. No one was killed in the crash; however, four people were hospitalised. The aircraft was damaged beyond repair.

References

External links

Official website 
Official website 
Official website (archived from 2005) 

Airlines of Russia
Airlines established in 2002
Airlines banned in the European Union
Russian companies established in 2002
Russian brands
Companies based in Sakha Republic
Government-owned companies of Russia